was the religious reformer and founder of the first independent branch of Japanese Pure Land Buddhism called . He is also considered the Seventh Jōdo Shinshū Patriarch.

Hōnen became a Tendai initiate at an early age, but grew disaffected and sought an approach to Buddhism that anyone could follow, even during the perceived Age of Dharma Decline. After discovering the writings of the Chinese Buddhist Shandao, he undertook the teaching of rebirth in the pure land of Amitābha through nianfo or "recitation of the Buddha's name".

Hōnen gathered a wide array of followers and critics. Emperor Tsuchimikado exiled Hōnen and his followers in 1207 after an incident regarding two of his disciples in addition to persuasion by influential Buddhist communities. Hōnen was eventually pardoned and allowed to return to Kyoto, where he stayed for a short time before his death.

Biography

Early life 

Hōnen was born to a prominent family in the city of Kume in Mimasaka Province. His father was Uruma no Tokikuni, a province official who headed up policing in the area. According to legend, his mother is a descendant of the Hata clan. Hōnen was originally named Seishimaru after the bodhisattva Seishi (Sanskrit Mahāsthāmaprāpta). In 1141 Hōnen's father was assassinated by Sada-akira, an official sent by Emperor Horikawa to govern the province. It is believed that Tokikuni's last words to his son were "Don't hate the enemy but become a monk and pray for me and for your deliverance."

Fulfilling his father's wishes for him, Hōnen was initiated into his uncle's monastery at the age of nine. From then on, Hōnen lived his life as a monk, and eventually studied at the primary Tendai temple at Mount Hiei near Kyoto. Clerics at Mt. Hiei took the bodhisattva vows and then undertook 12 years of training at Mt. Hiei, a system developed by the Tendai founder, Saichō.

While at Mt. Hiei, Hōnen studied under Genkō (源光), Kōen (皇円) and later, with Eikū (叡空). Under Kōen he was officially ordained as a Tendai priest, while under Eikū he received the name Hōnen-bō Genkū (法然房源空). In speaking of himself, Hōnen often referred to himself as Genkū, as did his close disciples.

Departure from Mt. Hiei 

While studying on Mt. Hiei, Hōnen devoted his time to finding a way to bring salvation to all beings through Buddhism, but was not satisfied with what he found at Mt. Hiei. At the age of 24, Hōnen then went to study at the city of Saga, then Nara, and stayed at such temples at Kōfuku-ji and Tōdai-ji. Still not satisfied, he returned to the libraries of Mt. Hiei and studied further.

During this period, Hōnen read a Pure Land Buddhist text called the Commentaries on the Amitayurdhyana Sutra authored by the Chinese Pure Land master Shandao (613-681), notably the statement, "Only repeat the name of Amitabha with all your heart.  Whether walking or standing, sitting or lying, never cease the practice of it even for a moment.  This is the very work which unfailingly issues in salvation, for it is in accordance with the Original Vow of that Buddha." This commentary persuaded Hōnen to believe that nianfo, called nembutsu in Japanese, was all one needed to enter Amitābha's pure land. Previously, nianfo was recited along with other practices, but Shandao was the first to propose that only nianfo was necessary.  This new appreciation and understanding prompted Hōnen to leave Mt. Hiei and the Tendai tradition in 1175.

Beginnings of a New Sect 

Hōnen relocated to the district of Ōtani in Kyoto, where he started addressing crowds of men and women, establishing a considerable following. Hōnen attracted fortune-tellers, ex-robbers, samurai and other elements of society normally excluded from Buddhist practice. Hōnen was a man of recognition in Kyoto, and many priests and nobleman allied with him and visited him for spiritual advice. Among them was an imperial regent named Kujō Kanezane (1149–1207). The increasing popularity of his teachings drew criticism from noted contemporaries as Myōe and Jōkei among others, who argued against Hōnen's sole reliance on nembutsu as a means of rebirth in a pure land. Additionally, some disciples interpreted Hōnen's teachings in unexpected ways, leading to disreputable behavior, criticism of other sects, or other forms of antinomianism.

In 1204, the monks at Mt. Hiei implored the head priest to ban the teachings of exclusive nembutsu and to banish any adherents from their principality. In 1205 the temple of Kōfuku-ji, located in Nara, implored Emperor Toba II to sanction Hōnen and his followers. The temple provided the emperor with nine charges alleging unappeasable differences with the so-called eight schools. Hōnen's detractors cited examples of his followers, such as Gyoku and Kōsai, who committed vandalism against Buddhist temples, intentionally broke the Buddhist precepts, or caused others to intentionally turn away from established Buddhist teachings.

Richard Bowring condenses these charges into two general forms. First is the nature of a single practice. Hōnen's emphasis on the single practice of nembutsu denied the usefulness of all other Buddhist practices. The sole emphasis on Amitābha was also coupled with discouraging the traditional worship of the kami. The second charge was that Hōnen placed the most lowly layperson on equal footing with the wisest monk, rendering the entire monastic establishment as useless.

The clamour surrounding Hōnen's teachings dissipated for a time until 1207 when Toba II implemented a ban against exclusive nembutsu, stemming from an incident where two of Hōnen's most prominent followers were accused of using nembutsu practice as a coverup for sexual liaisons.  As part of the ban, Hōnen and some of his disciples, including Shinran, were exiled, while the priests responsible for the conversion, Juren and Anrakubo, were executed. Hōnen is said to have responded:

Exile and the Final Years 

Hōnen was exiled to Tosa, but the movement in Kyoto had not thoroughly gone away.  While in exile, Hōnen spread the teachings to the people he met - fishermen, prostitutes, and the peasantry. In 1211 the nembutsu ban was ultimately lifted, and Hōnen was permitted to return to Kyoto. In 1212, the following year, Hōnen died in Kyoto, but was able to compose the  a few days before he died.

Character 

Analysis of various historical documents by the Jodo Shu Research Institute suggests several obvious characteristics of Hōnen's personality:

 a strict master
 introspective and self-critical
 a bold innovator
 a critic of scholasticism
 a man more concerned with solving the problems of daily life rather than worrying about doctrinal matters

On the latter point Hōnen expressed unusual concern over the spiritual welfare of women. In teaching to them, regardless of social status (from aristocracy to prostitutes), he particularly rejected the significance of menstruation; which wider Japanese religious culture considered to cause spiritual defilement.  As a consequence the role of women in the Jōdo-shū sects has often been greater than in some other Japanese Buddhist traditions.

About himself Hōnen reportedly said:

Doctrine

Writings 

Hōnen's main document expounding his Pure Land doctrine is the Senchaku Hongan Nenbutsushū written in 1198 at the request of his patron Lord Kujō Kanezane (1148–1207). The document was not widely distributed by Hōnen's request until after his death. The only other document from Hōnen is his last testament, the Ichimai-kishōmon (一枚起請文) or "One-Sheet Document". Most of Hōnen's teachings are recorded by his disciples, or recorded later by Buddhist historians in the 14th century.

Quotation 

Hōnen's teachings are briefly summarized in his final work, the One-Sheet Document:

 

Hōnen's practical advice on practicing the nembutsu can be summed up in these two statements:

Disciples 

By 1204 Hōnen had a group of disciples numbering around 190. Key disciples who signed the pledge include:

 Benchō (1162–1238), founder of the main Chinzei branch of Jōdo-shū.  Often called Shōkō.  Exiled in 1207 to Kyushu.
 Genchi (1183–1238), Hōnen's personal attendant, and close friend of Benchō.
 Shōkū (1147–1247), founder of the Seizan branch of Jōdo-shū. Not exiled.
 Shinran (1173–1263), founder of the Jōdo Shinshū branch of Pure Land Buddhism. Exiled to Echigo Province in 1207.
 Ryūkan (1148–1227), founder of the many-recitation or Tanengi branch of Jōdo-shū.
Chōsai (1184–1266), founder of the Shōgyōhongangi branch of Jōdo-shū which believed that all Buddhist practices can lead to rebirth in the Pureland.
 Kōsai (1163–1247), promoted the controversial Ichinengi, or "single-recitation" teaching of Jōdo-shū.  Expelled from Honen's community before the exile of 1207.
 Gyōkō (?), another proponent of Ichinengi doctrine. Exiled to Sado in 1207.
 Rensei (1141–1208), formerly a notable samurai named Kumagai no Jirō Naozane who had fought at the Battle of Ichi-no-Tani and killed the Heike leader Taira no Atsumori
 Kansai (1148–1200).
 Shinkū (1146–1228).
 Anrakubō (? -1207), executed during the purge of 1207.
 Jūren (?), executed along with Anrakubō in 1207.

A number of disciples went on to establish branches of Pure Land Buddhism, based on their interpretations of Honen's teachings.

Notes

References 

 Dobbins, James C. (1989). Jodo Shinshu: Shin Buddhism in Medieval Japan. Bloomington, Illinois: Indiana University Press. ;  OCLC 470742039
 Hônen : "Le gué vers la Terre Pure", Senchaku-shû, traduit du sino-japonais, présenté et annoté par Jérôme Ducor. Collection "Trésors du bouddhisme". Paris, Librairie Arthème Fayard, 2005. 
 Takahashi Koji. Senchakushu no seikaku ni tsuite: tokuni hi ronriteki ichimen o chushin to shite. in Jodokyo no shiso to bunka, Etani Festschrift (Kyoto: Dohosha, 1972)
 
 Augustine, Morris J., Kondō, Tesshō, trans. (1997). "Senchaku hongan nembutsu shū": a collection of passages on the nembutsu chosen in the original vow  compiled by Genkū (Hōnen), Berkeley, Calif.: Numata Center for Buddhist Translation and Research. 
 Jokai Asai (2001). Exclusion and Salvation in Honen's Thought: Salvation of Those Who Commit the Five Grave Offenses or Slander the Right Dharma, Pacific World Journal, Third Series, Number 3, 125-156. Archived from the original
 Sho-on Hattori, A Raft from the Other Shore: Honen and the Way of Pure Land Buddhism, Jodo Shu Press, Tōkyō, 2001, 
 Sōhō Machida, Renegade monk : Hōnen and Japanese Pure Land Buddhism, University of California Press, Berkeley, 1999, 
 Jonathan Watts, Yoshiharu Tomatsu, Traversing the Pure Land Path: A Lifetime of Encounters with Honen Shonin, Jodo Shu Press, Tōkyō, 2005,

External links 
 Honen Shonin’s Religious and Social Significance in the Pure Land Tradition by Alfred Bloom
 Kyoto National Museum: The Illustrated Biography of Priest Honen 
 法然上人全集
 法然上人とは
 法然上人資料室
 法然上人関係文献

 
12th-century Buddhist monks
13th-century Buddhist monks
1133 births
1212 deaths
Japanese Buddhist clergy
Buddhist patriarchs
Pure Land Buddhism
Jōdo-shū
 
Shinran

Founders of Buddhist sects
Heian period Buddhist clergy
Kamakura period Buddhist clergy
Jōdo Shin patriarchs